Eugenia Salvi (born 22 June 1960 in Castenedolo, Italy) is an athlete from Italy who competes in compound archery. She took up archery in 1999 and first represented the national senior team in 2002. She has since won individual gold medals at the World Championships and Indoor World Championships, a stage win in Antalya at the 2008 World Cup, and several team medals.

References

1960 births
Living people
Italian female archers
World Archery Championships medalists
21st-century Italian women